The 1983–84 BYU Cougars men's basketball team represented Brigham Young University as a member of the Western Athletic Conference during the 1983–84 basketball season. Led by head coach LaDell Andersen, the Cougars compiled a record of 20–11 (12–4 WAC) to finish second in the WAC regular season standings. The team played their home games at the Marriott Center in Provo, Utah. The Cougars received an at-large bid to the NCAA tournament as No. 8 seed in the Mideast region. In the opening round, BYU defeated UAB before losing to No. 1 seed Kentucky in the round of 32, 93–68.

Roster

Schedule and results

|-
!colspan=9 style=| Regular Season

|-
!colspan=9 style=| WAC Tournament

|-
!colspan=9 style=| NCAA tournament

Players in the 1993 NBA Draft

References

BYU Cougars men's basketball seasons
Byu
Byu